Awu or AWU may refer to:

 Awu language, an unclassified Loloish language of Yunnan, China
 Mount Awu, a volcano in Indonesia
 Antigua Workers' Union
 Amalgamated Workers Union, a trade union in Trinidad and Tobago
 Australian Workers' Union
 American World University
 Alphabet Workers Union, an American union of workers at Alphabet Inc., the parent company of Google